Dragan Milosavljević (born May 11, 1989) is a Serbian professional basketball player for Igokea of the ABA League. He also represented the Serbian national basketball team internationally.

Professional career

Early career
Milosavljević began his career in Napredak Kruševac where he played until 2009. He was signed by Radnički Kragujevac in 2009. He stayed there for one season, playing in the Serbian League and ABA League. In the ABA League, he averaged 10.2 points, 3.8 rebounds and 2.1 assists per game for Radnički.

Partizan Belgrade (2010–2015)
On June 28, 2010, he signed a three-year deal with Partizan Belgrade. In his first season in Partizan, he won the Adriatic League, Serbian League and Radivoj Korać Cup. In the EuroLeague, Milosavljević averaged 4.2 points and 1.9 rebounds per game, while in the ABA League he averaged 6.9 points and 3 rebounds per game.

In his second season, Milosavlijevic helped his club to defend titles in Serbian League and Radivoj Korać Cup. In the 2011–12 Euroleague season, he averaged 8.2 points and 3.7 rebounds in 10 games of group stage. In the 2011–12 Adriatic League season, Milosavljević averaged 8.3 points and 3.6 rebounds over 27 games. On July 4, 2012, he extended his contract for two more seasons with Partizan.

Next season, Milosavljević won the Serbian League for the third time and he was named the MVP of the finals. In the 2012–13 Euroleague, he scored a career-high of 9.9 points per game. In the Adriatic League he helped his team to return the title after a one-year break averaging 6.8 points and 3.2 rebounds per game.

Despite some financial difficulties the club was facing in the summer of 2013, Dragan Milosavljevic decided to stay with Partizan Belgrade. Then, after the departure of team captain Vladimir Lučić, he became the next team captain. Along with Léo Westermann and Bogdan Bogdanović he was supposed to lead the backcourt of Partizan in the upcoming season. In a second game of the 2013–14 Euroleague season against JSF Nanterre, he scored 26 points, while also pulling down 6 rebounds, to help his team win by huge margin. In the Euroleague game against Maccabi Tel Aviv on January 24, he has torn ACL on his right knee, which sidelined him for the remainder of the season. He was expected to return on court in six to eight months. In his first season as captain of Partizan, he averaged career-high 12.1 points and 3.7 rebounds per game in the 2013–14 Euroleague, while also averaging 12.4 points, 3.3 rebounds and 2.6 assists in 17 games of the 2013–14 Adriatic League season.

On August 5, 2014, Milosavljević extended his contract for one more season with the club. In December 2014, he returned on the court after ten months of absence due to the injury. The rest of the season, he averaged 11 points, 3.7 rebounds and 1 assist over ABA League 20 games.

Alba Berlin (2015–2017)
On June 25, 2015, Milosavljević signed a two-year contract with the German club Alba Berlin. On October 1, he debuted for the team in 74–54 win over ratiopharm Ulm in Round 1 of the German League; he had 5 points, 5 rebounds and 4 assists. Alba Berlin eventually lost in the quarterfinal series of 2016 BBL Playoffs with 3–0 to Skyliners Frankfurt. In the German League, he averaged 12.3 points, 5.1 rebounds and 2.5 assists over 35 games. In 2015–16 Eurocup season, Milosavljević appeared in 17 games, averaging 14.5 points, 4.9 rebounds and 2.7 assists per game. 

In 2016–17 season, Alba Berlin was once again stopped in the quarterfinal series of 2017 BBL Playoffs with 3–1 to Bayern Munich. In 30 games of the German League, Milosavljević averaged 12.7 points, 3.1 rebounds and 3.9 assists per game. 2016–17 EuroCup season, Milosavljević averaged 12.9 points, 2.7 rebounds and 3.6 assists over 14 games.

Unicaja Málaga (2017–2021)
In July 2017, he signed a contract with the Spanish team Unicaja Málaga. In his first season with the club, he appeared in 27 EuroLeague games and averaged 6.4 points and 2.6 rebounds per game. In ACB League, he averaged 4.5 points per game.

In 2018–19 season, he averaged 6.2 points and 2.6 assists in 19 EuroCup appearances for Unicaja. In 37 ACB League games, he had similar production, averaging 6.6 points per game.

On June 12, 2019, Milosavljević signed a two-year contract extension with Unicaja. In August 2019, while representing Serbia in a game against Turkey, as part of preparations for the 2019 FIBA Basketball World Cup, Milosavljević suffered ACL tear in his left knee, which will keep him off the court at least until 2020. In November 2020, he returned to trainings after a 15-month break. 

On February 17, 2021, the club parted ways with Milosavljević.

KK Mega Basket (2021)
On April 2, 2021, he has signed with Mega Soccerbet of the Basketball League of Serbia.

Bursaspor Basketbol (2021) 
On July 6, 2021, Milosavljević signed with Bursaspor Basketbol of the Basketbol Süper Ligi and the EuroCup.

Urban Fuenlabrada (2021–2022) 
On November 22, 2021, he has signed with Urbas Fuenlabrada of the Liga ACB.

Serbian national team

The Serbian national team head coach Dušan Ivković called Milosavljević for the 2010 FIBA World Championship in Turkey, but he didn't manage to make the final roster.

He represented Serbia for the first time at the EuroBasket 2015 under head coach Aleksandar Đorđević. In the first phase of the tournament, Serbia dominated in the toughest Group B with 5-0 record, and then eliminated Finland and Czech Republic in the round of 16 and quarterfinal game, respectively. However, they were stopped in the semifinal game by Lithuania with 67–64, and eventually lost to the host team France in the bronze-medal game with 81–68. Over 7 tournament games played, Milosavljević saw very little playing time, mostly being used by head coach as a defensive task specialist.

Milosavljević also represented Serbia at the EuroBasket 2017 where they won the silver medal, after losing in the final game to Slovenia.

In preparations for the 2019 FIBA Basketball World Cup, Milosavljević was on the list of 14 candidates for the final 12-men roster of Serbia, but he suffered serious left knee injury in a friendly Acropolis Tournament game against Turkey. The injury was later diagnosed to be ACL tear, preventing Milosavljević to represent Serbia in the World Cup.

Career statistics

Euroleague

|-
| style="text-align:left;"| 2010–11
| style="text-align:left;" rowspan=4| Partizan
| 16 || 6 || 19.0 || .381 || .222 || .650 || 1.9 || .8 || .6 || .1 || 4.2 || 1.3
|-
| style="text-align:left;"| 2011–12
| 10 || 10 || 28.9 || .333 || .239 || .810 || 3.7 || 1.4 || .6 || .6 || 8.2 || 5.9
|-
| style="text-align:left;"| 2012–13
| 10 || 7 || 26.5 || .522 || .273 || .724 || 2.8 || 1.2 || .9 || .4 || 9.9 || 9.2
|-
| style="text-align:left;"| 2013–14
| 14 || 13 || 32.0 || .435 || .344 || .667 || 3.7 || 1.6 || .9 || .3 || 12.1 || 9.7
|-
| style="text-align:left;"| 2017–18
| style="text-align:left;"| Unicaja
| 27 || 16 || 18.5 || .417 || .333 || .769 || 2.6 || 1.0 || .5 || .1 || 6.4 || 5.6
|- class="sortbottom"
| style="text-align:left;"| Career
| style="text-align:left;"|
| 77 || 52 || 23.4 || .419 || .296 || .727 || 2.8 || 1.1 || .7 || .2 || 7.7 || 6.0

References

External links
Dragan Milosavljević at aba-liga.com
Dragan Milosavljević  at acb.com 
Dragan Milosavljević at beko-bbl.de 
Dragan Milosavljević at euroleague.net
Dragan Milosavljević at fiba.com
Dragan Milosavljević at tblstat.net

1989 births
Living people
ABA League players
Alba Berlin players
Baloncesto Fuenlabrada players
Baloncesto Málaga players
Basketball League of Serbia players
Bursaspor Basketbol players
KK Igokea players
KK Mega Basket players
KK Napredak Kruševac players
KK Partizan players
KK Radnički Kragujevac (2009–2014) players
Liga ACB players
Serbia men's national basketball team players
Serbian expatriate basketball people in Bosnia and Herzegovina
Serbian expatriate basketball people in Germany
Serbian expatriate basketball people in Spain
Serbian expatriate basketball people in Turkey
Serbian men's basketball players
Shooting guards
Sportspeople from Kruševac